Count of Manila (Spanish: Conde de Manila) is a Spanish hereditary title created in 1848 for Narciso Clavería y Zaldúa, Governor-General of the Philippines.

The Philippines were at the time a Spanish colonial possession. The title was a reward for the success of a military campaign, the expedition to Balanguingui.

Upon Narciso's death in 1851, his son Jose Clavería y Berroeta succeeded as second Count of Manila.

References

Counts of Manila